The New Brunswick Sports Hall of Fame is a provincial sports hall of fame and museum in Fredericton, New Brunswick. The sports hall of fame honours athletes, teams, and sport builders that are from the Canadian province of New Brunswick. New nominees to the hall of fame are inducted to the hall of fame on an annual basis.

Established in 1970, the organization operates as an independent non-profit charity with a mandate to "preserve and celebrate" the sports heritage of New Brunswick. The New Brunswick Sports Hall of Fame museum holds exhibits about inducted builders, individual athletes, and groups/teams.

Museum
The Sports Hall of Fame operates a Sports Museum at 503 Queen Street in the province's capital city of Fredericton. The museum is situated within the John Thurston Clark Memorial Building. The museum is equipped with interactive exhibits and one of the largest collection of charcoal portraits in the province, one for each of its Hall of Fame inductees.

The building was originally opened as a customs and post office in 1881. The building was later named after the son of William George Clark, the Lieutenant Governor of New Brunswick. The New Brunswick Sports Hall of Fame moved into the John Thurston Clark Memorial Building in 1976.

Hall of Famers
As of 2019, over 250 in individuals and teams have been inducted in the New Brunswick Sports Hall of Fame. Inductees are formally categorized into two categories, builders or players, the latter category including individual athletes and entire groups or teams.

Eligibility into the hall for athletes is determined by distinction brought to the province, whereas eligibility for builders is determined by the nominee's contribution to the development of the sport in New Brunswick. In order to be inducted in the hall of fame, candidates must first be nominated, with nomination of deceased individuals requiring further consent from the nominee's family. Nomination deadlines for each induction year is 30 November.

Select players inductees
Individual inductees

Marc Albert - volleyball
Earle Avery - harness racing
Ethel Babbitt - National tennis champion
Norman Buchanan (MC) - baseball. An army officer, politician, business man. He served during the Second World War and was awarded the Military Cross with two bars, an extremely high honour held by only 23 other Commonwealth Officers.
Rhéal Cormier - Major League Baseball pitcher
Tony Currie - National Hockey League player
Mabel DeWare - National curling champion
Gordie Drillon - National Hockey League player
Yvon Durelle - boxing champion
Dave Durepos - wheelchair basketball
Dick Gamble - National Hockey League player
Charles Gorman - speed skater
Danny Grant - National Hockey League player
Bill Harris - Major League Baseball player
Buster Harvey - ice hockey player
Russ Howard - Olympic Gold Medal in curling
Marianne Limpert - swimmer
Willy Logan - speed skater
Peter Maher - ice hockey announcer
Greg Malone - National Hockey League player
Manny McIntyre - hockey and baseball player
Roland McLenahan - National Hockey League  
Roland Melanson - National Hockey League player
Willie O'Ree - first Black player in the National Hockey League
Scott Pellerin - National Hockey League player
Marc Pepin - tennis champion
Matt Stairs - Major League Baseball player
Don Sweeney - National Hockey League player
Milaine Thériault - cross-country skier
Ron Turcotte - Hall of Fame jockey who rode Secretariat to the Triple Crown
Stacy Wilson - Olympic women's hockey player

Group/team inductees
The Paris Crew - world rowing champions
Campbellton Tigers - 1972 ice hockey club
Campbellton Tigers - 1977 ice hockey club
Moncton Hawks - 1970 ice hockey club

See also
 Canada's Sports Hall of Fame
 Alberta Sports Hall of Fame
 BC Sports Hall of Fame
 Manitoba Sports Hall of Fame
 Nova Scotia Sports Hall of Fame
 Ontario Sports Hall of Fame
 List of museums in New Brunswick

References

External links
 

New Brunswick Sports Hall of Fame inductees

Museums in Fredericton
Sports museums in Canada
Halls of fame in Canada
All-sports halls of fame
Canadian sports trophies and awards
Awards established in 1970
1970 establishments in New Brunswick
New Brunswick awards